Ambroise, sometimes Ambroise of Normandy, (flourished ) was a Norman poet and chronicler of the Third Crusade, author of a work called , which describes in rhyming Old French verse the adventures of  as a crusader.  The poem is known to us only through one Vatican manuscript, and long escaped the notice of historians.

Ambroise followed Richard I as a noncombatant, and not improbably as a court-minstrel. He speaks as an eyewitness of the king's doings at Messina, in Cyprus,  at the siege of Acre, and in the abortive campaign which followed the capture of that city.

Ambroise is surprisingly accurate in his chronology; though he did not complete his work before 1195, it is evidently founded upon notes which he had taken in the course of his pilgrimage.  He shows no greater political insight than we should expect from his position; but relates what he had seen and heard with a naïve vivacity which compels attention. He is by no means an impartial source: he is prejudiced against the Saracens, against the French, and against all the rivals or enemies of his master, including the Polein party which supported Conrad of Montferrat against Guy of Lusignan. He is rather to be treated as a biographer than as a historian of the Crusade in its broader aspects. Nonetheless he is an interesting primary source for the events of the years 1190–1192 in the Kingdom of Jerusalem.

Books 2–6 of the Itinerarium Regis Ricardi, a Latin prose narrative of the same events apparently compiled by Richard, a canon of Holy Trinity, London, are closely related to Ambroise's poem. They were formerly sometimes regarded as the first-hand narrative on which Ambroise based his work, but that can no longer be maintained.

Published edition

 Ambroise, L´Estoire de la guerre sainte. Paris, 1897: http://gallica.bnf.fr/ark:/12148/bpt6k6517331f.r
 Ambroise, Itinerarium regis Ricardi. London, 1920: https://archive.org/details/itinerariumregis00richuoft
 Ambroise, The History of the Holy War, translated by Marianne Ailes, Boydell Press, 2003.

See also
Anglo-Norman literature
Norman language

Notes

12th-century deaths
Anglo-Norman literature
Medieval writers about the Crusades
Year of birth unknown
12th-century French poets
Christians of the Third Crusade